The Fig Garden Village Open Invitational was a golf tournament on the PGA Tour that was played at the San Joaquin Country Club in Fresno, California. It was first held in October 1963, and was won by Mason Rudolph, a 29-year-old native of Tennessee by three strokes over Tommy Aaron and Al Geiberger. In 1964, it was called the Fresno Open Invitational and was again played at San Joaquin CC with Canadian George Knudson the winner in a playoff with fellow Canadian Al Balding.

Winner

References

Former PGA Tour events
Golf in California
Sports competitions in Fresno, California
1963 establishments in California
1964 establishments in California